Laranja da Terra is a municipality located in the Brazilian state of Espírito Santo. Its population was 10,933 (2020) and its area is 458 km². East Pomeranian, a dialect of Low German, has co-official status in Laranja da Terra.

References

Municipalities in Espírito Santo